Diplopterys cabrerana is a shrub native to the Amazon Basin, spanning the countries of Brazil, Colombia, Ecuador and Peru. In the Quechua languages it is called chaliponga or chagropanga; in parts of Ecuador it is known as chacruna—a name otherwise reserved for Psychotria viridis.

D. cabrerana and P. viridis are both common admixtures for ayahuasca. Both species are rich sources of  N,N-DMT, a tryptamine thought to be endogenous in humans and many other species. D. cabrerana additionally  produces 5-MeO-DMT, a less common structural analog.

The plant stores the alkaloids N,N-DMT, 5-MeO-n,n-DMT, and N-methyltetrahydro-beta-carboline in its leaves and stems. Leaf samples were found to be 0.17-1.75% N,N-DMT, but only trace amounts of N-methyltetrahydro-beta-carboline occur in the leaves. The leaves also store methyltryptamine and trace amounts of bufotenin.

Cuttings of D. cabrerana are transplantable. The cuttings are either planted in soil directly, or rooted first in water.

See also
Psychedelic plants

References

External links
 The genus Diplopterys Ayahuasca: alkaloids, plants & analogs
 A General Introduction to Ayahuasca
 Diplopterys cabrerana fruit
 University of Michigan Herbarium - Diplopterys cabrerana June 2014

Ayahuasca
Entheogens
Flora of the Amazon
Herbal and fungal hallucinogens
Malpighiaceae
Psychedelic tryptamine carriers
Vines